HD 130322 b is an exoplanet with a minimum mass slightly more than that of Jupiter. It orbits the star in a very close orbit distance being only a quarter that of Mercury from the Sun. It is thus a so-called "hot Jupiter". The planet orbits the star every 10 days 17 hours in a very circular orbit.

The planet HD 130322 b is named Eiger. The name was selected in the NameExoWorlds campaign by Switzerland, during the 100th anniversary of the IAU. Eiger is one of the prominent peaks of the Bernese Alps.

References

External links
 

Exoplanets discovered in 1999
Giant planets
Virgo (constellation)
Exoplanets detected by radial velocity
Exoplanets with proper names
Hot Jupiters